Mubarak Faraj Bilal (born 1972) is an Emirati swimmer. He competed in the men's 50 metre freestyle at the 1988 Summer Olympics.

References

1972 births
Living people
Emirati male swimmers
Olympic swimmers of the United Arab Emirates
Swimmers at the 1988 Summer Olympics
Place of birth missing (living people)